The eastern cave bat or Troughton's forest bat (Vespadelus troughtoni) is a species of vesper bat in the family Vespertilionidae. It is found only in Australia, where it lives in caves along the east coast and in adjacent inland ranges.

References

Bats of Australia
Vespadelus
Mammals of New South Wales
Mammals of Queensland
Mammals described in 1987
Taxa named by Darrell Kitchener
Taxonomy articles created by Polbot